Joppa Baptist Church and Cemetery is a historic church and cemetery in Mammoth Cave National Park in Kentucky. It was added to the National Register of Historic Places in 1991.

Joppa Baptist Church was established in 1861 and the present church was built in about 1900. The church is a one-story frame building on a sandstone block foundation.

See also 
 Good Spring Baptist Church and Cemetery: also in Mammoth Cave National Park
 Mammoth Cave Baptist Church and Cemetery: also in Mammoth Cave Baptist Church and Cemetery
 National Register of Historic Places listings in Edmonson County, Kentucky
 National Register of Historic Places listings in Mammoth Cave National Park

References

External links
 
 

Baptist cemeteries in the United States
Baptist churches in Kentucky
Cemeteries on the National Register of Historic Places in Kentucky
Churches on the National Register of Historic Places in Kentucky
Churches in Edmonson County, Kentucky
Historic districts on the National Register of Historic Places in Kentucky
National Register of Historic Places in Edmonson County, Kentucky
National Register of Historic Places in Mammoth Cave National Park
1900 establishments in Kentucky
Churches completed in 1900